Vice-Admiral Sir Ronald Vernon Brockman  (8 March 1909 – 3 September 1999) was a British senior officer of the Royal Navy. He served under Lord Mountbatten and participated in accepting the surrender of the Japanese Fleet in 1945. Sir Ronald was the elder son of Engineer Rear-Admiral Henry Stafford Brockman CB.  He was descendant of the English Brockman family, and was Gentleman Usher to the Queen from 1967 to 1979.

Military service
Sir Ronald was educated at Weymouth College in Dorset and joined the Royal Navy in 1927 as a paymaster cadet (later Supply Officer). He was promoted to paymaster sub-lieutenant on 16 April 1930 (seniority from 1 September 1929) and to paymaster lieutenant on 1 October 1931. He served as the Assistant Secretary to the First Sea Lord, Admiral of the Fleet Sir Roger Backhouse from 1938 to 1939 and was promoted to paymaster lieutenant-commander on 1 October 1939.

He was the Admiral's Secretary to Admiral of the Fleet Sir Dudley Pound during World War II from 1939 to 1943. Promoted to paymaster commander on 31 December 1943, he served as Admiral's Secretary to Admiral of the Fleet Lord Louis (Francis Albert Victor) Mountbatten (Lord Mountbatten of Burma from 1946) from 1943 to 1959 and as an acting captain was the Private Secretary to Mountbatten as Governor General of India from 1947 to 1948. Finally, he served as the Senior Staff Officer to the Chief of Defence Staff within the Ministry of Defence from 1959 to 1965. He was promoted to the substantive rank of captain (S) on 30 June 1953. He was promoted to rear admiral on 7 July 1960, and to vice-admiral on 6 April 1963. He retired from the Royal Navy on 6 December 1965.

He was appointed a KCB in the 1965 New Year Honours, CSI 1947, CIE 1946, CVO 1979 and CBE 1943. He was made a KStJ in 1985 and among his foreign awards were the Special Rosette of Cloud and Banner (China) 1948, Chevalier Legion of Honour and Croix de Guerre with Palm (France) 1950 and Bronze Star Medal (USA) 1947.

Personal life and death
In 1932 Brockman married Marjorie Jean Butt; they had one son and three daughters. He died on 3 September 1999, aged 90. He was the last surviving Companion of the Order of the Star of India. At his death, the Queen was represented by Sir Carron Grieg and the Duke of Edinburgh was represented by Rear-Admiral Sir Robert Woodard at a service of thanksgiving for Sir Ronald's life and service. The Prince of Wales was represented by Vice-Admiral Sir Christopher Morgan.

References

Sources
National Army Museum, London: The papers of Gen Sir Roy Bucher include correspondence with Brockman 1961-1972
Times Newspapers Limited, Edition 1FWED 17 November 1999, Page 24 Vice-Admiral Sir Ronald Brockman;Memorial services;Court & Social
Who's Who 1998

External links
 Imperial War Museum Interview

1909 births
1999 deaths
Royal Navy officers of World War II
Royal Navy vice admirals
Knights Commander of the Order of the Bath
Companions of the Order of the Star of India
Companions of the Order of the Indian Empire
Commanders of the Royal Victorian Order
Commanders of the Order of the British Empire
People educated at Weymouth College (public school)
Royal Navy logistics officers